The Bemidji State Beavers women's ice hockey program represented the Bemidji State University during the 2013-14 NCAA Division I women's ice hockey season. The Beavers finished sixth in WCHA play, and lost to the University of North Dakota in the WCHA playoffs.

Offseason

2013–14 Beavers

Schedule

|-
!colspan=12 style=""| Regular Season

|-
!colspan=12 style=""| WCHA Tournament

Awards and honors

References

Bemidji State
Bemidji State Beavers women's ice hockey seasons
Bemidji